National Assembly TV (NATV) is a South Korean cable and satellite television network that was created in 1991 by the South Korean cable television industry as a nonprofit public service. It provides a wide range of information on parliamentary activities, policy issues, and legislative information fairly, alongside live broadcasting of major meetings such as plenary sessions, committees, and hearings without editing. National Assembly TV is public broadcasting and is available to all South Korean paid broadcasting subscribers, reaching 98% of households with TVs.

The network organizes not only parliamentary broadcasts but also news programs including sign language three times a day, produces documentaries observing lawmakers' days, organizes political discussion programs for high school students, or organizes talk programs on books that have influenced lawmakers' lives.

External links 
 Official website
 Information Disclosure System
 National Assembly Webcast
 NATV on YouTube
 NATV on Naver TV

 
Television networks in South Korea
Korean-language television stations
Television channels in South Korea
Mass media companies of South Korea
Legislature broadcasters
Mass media in Seoul
National Assembly (South Korea)
Mass media companies established in 1991
Television channels and stations established in 2004
1991 establishments in South Korea
Yeouido